CS Caraș-Severin, formerly known as UCM HC Caraș-Severin, was a men's handball club from Reșița, Romania. The team reached twice the second spot in the Romanian Handball League.

In 2014, after the team relegated from the first division, the Local Council of Reșița decided to dissolve the club.

Achievements

Romanian League:
Runners-up (2): 2009, 2010
Romanian Cup:
Winners (1): 2010
Runners-up (2): 2009
EHF Challenge Cup:
Winners (3): 2007, 2008, 2009

References

External links
 Official Website

Defunct Romanian handball clubs
Sport in Reșița
Handball clubs established in 2004
Sports clubs disestablished in 2014
2004 establishments in Romania
2014 disestablishments in Romania